Quinalphos is an organothiophosphate chemical chiefly used as a pesticide. It is a reddish-brown liquid. The chemical formula is C12H15N2O3PS, and IUPAC name O,O-diethyl O-quinoxalin-2-yl phosphorothioate. Ranked 'moderately hazardous' in World Health Organization's (WHO) acute hazard ranking, use of quinalphos, classified as a yellow label (highly toxic) pesticide in India, is widely used in the following crops: wheat, rice, coffee, sugarcane, and cotton.

References

External links 

Organophosphate insecticides